In mathematics, a summability kernel is a family or sequence of periodic integrable functions satisfying a certain set of properties, listed below. Certain kernels, such as the Fejér kernel, are particularly useful in Fourier analysis. Summability kernels are related to approximation of the identity; definitions of an approximation of identity vary, but sometimes the definition of an approximation of the identity is taken to be the same as for a summability kernel.

Definition
Let . A summability kernel is a sequence  in  that satisfies
  
  (uniformly bounded) 

Note that if  for all , i.e.  is a positive summability kernel, then the second requirement follows automatically from the first.

Examples
 The Fejér kernel
 The Poisson kernel (continuous index)
 The Dirichlet kernel is not a summability kernel, since it fails the second requirement.

Convolutions
Let  be a summability kernel, and  denote the convolution operation.
In the case of the Fejer kernel this is known as Fejér's theorem.
This uses the Hardy–Littlewood maximal function. If  is not radially decreasing symmetric, but the decreasing symmetrization  satisfies , then a.e. convergence still holds, using a similar argument.

References

Mathematical analysis
Fourier series